The Federal Freight is a railway business established in Russia by Russian Railways, as part of plans to open up the rail transport market in Russia. A fleet of 180 thousand freight wagons will be transferred to the new company from RZD. It will have a share capital of 46.4 billion rubles. The company is headquartered in Ekaterinburg.

Services began on 1 October 2010. Plans include fleet expansion - to approximately 200,000 freight wagons - and aggressive pricing to increase market share.

References

External links
 

Railway companies of Russia
Rail freight transport in Russia
Rail freight companies
Companies based in Yekaterinburg
Russian Railways